D. edulis may refer to:
 Dacryodes edulis, the safou, a fruit tree species native to Africa
 Dudleya edulis, the fingertip, a succulent plant species native to southern California and Baja California

See also
 Edulis (disambiguation)